Ryan Jeffrey Preece (born October 25, 1990) is an American professional stock car racing driver. He competes full-time in the NASCAR Cup Series, driving the No. 41 Ford Mustang for Stewart-Haas Racing.

Preece previously competed in what is now the ARCA Menards Series East and West. He is also a veteran of the NASCAR Whelen Modified Tour and won the series championship in 2013 after being the runner-up in 2009 and 2012. Preece also made multiple starts in the defunct NASCAR Whelen Southern Modified Tour.

Racing career

Early career

Preece began racing in 2007 and became 32nd in the championship in the Northeastern Midget Association with the Bertrand team. A year later he finished on the podium for the first time in his career with a third place at Monadnock in his only Northeastern Midget race that year.

Preece competed in and won the championship in the SK Modified Series in 2011 at Stafford Motor Speedway, while his future wife Heather was the series' Rookie of the Year.

Whelen Modified Tour

That same year, he got his first career victory in the Whelen Modified Tour after dominating the Made In America Whelen 300 at Martinsville. In 2009 and 2012, he was runner-up in the NASCAR Whelen Modified Tour, but he became champion in 2013 with four wins in fourteen races driving for Flamingo Motorsports, owned by Eric Sanderson. In 2014, he returned to the team and won the last two races of the year, coming home in second place in the final standings. In 2015, he drove for TS Haulers Racing, owned by Ed Partridge.

On November 24, 2016, it was announced that Preece would remain at JD Motorsports for another full season in 2017. However, on December 8, 2016, it was announced that Preece and JD Motorsports had parted ways, letting Preece explore other opportunities. The primary reason why Preece left JD is that he wanted to be in a team to win races and expected to be back in the Whelen Modified Tour in 2017. He rejoined Partridge's team in the Modified Tour.

Xfinity Series

2013–2017

He made his debut in the Nationwide Series in 2013 and finished 24th at Loudon driving the No. 8 Chevrolet Camaro for Tommy Baldwin Racing. In 2014, he drove two races driving the No. 36 Camaro for TBR at Loudon and Homestead, with a best finish of 14th.

On August 8, 2015, Preece announced he would make his NASCAR Cup Series debut for TBR at Loudon. Preece joined JD Motorsports full-time in 2016, driving the No. 01 Chevrolet in the Xfinity Series. The primary sponsor was Flex Seal. Preece has several decent runs for the mid-pack organization in 2016, just missing the first ever Xfinity playoffs.

2017–2018: Joe Gibbs Racing
In July 2017, he returned to the Xfinity Series, racing at Loudon in the No. 20 Toyota Camry for Joe Gibbs Racing with sponsorship from Mohawk Northeast and Mizzy Construction, finishing a career-best second behind teammate Kyle Busch. The opportunity originally came after Kevin Manion contacted Preece about openings at JGR after the retirement of Carl Edwards.

At Iowa, Preece returned to the No. 20 with Mohawk and Falmouth Construction sponsoring. Preece won the pole and held off teammate Kyle Benjamin on a late restart to win his first career Xfinity race.

After his Iowa win, JGR announced that Preece would also drive for the team at Kentucky Speedway in September (a standalone Xfinity race), and later Homestead (where Cup drivers, regardless of experience, are prohibited from participating). Preece, with the American Red Cross on the No. 20 car, finished 4th at Kentucky.

Preece moved to Gibbs’ No. 18 Safelite Toyota at Homestead. Preece was involved in a controversy, as championship contender Elliott Sadler placed the blame on Preece for blocking him on the final restart of the season. Preece still managed a top 5 finish.

On November 15, 2017, it was announced that Preece would run another partial schedule with JGR in 2018, running at least ten races in the No. 18 car, sharing it with JGR Cup drivers Kyle Busch, Erik Jones and Daniel Suárez, JGR development driver Kyle Benjamin, and Australian James Davison.  While he is listed for ten races, more races are possible. Sponsorship of Preece's races in the No. 18 would come primarily from Rheem. A few of the races were instead supported by Ruud and its affiliate businesses.

Preece began his season with a 9th-place finish at California, his first time finishing outside the top 5 at Gibbs. He got back in the top 5 a week later at Texas.

Preece became eligible for the Xfinity Dash 4 Cash after his good run at Texas. The next week at Bristol, Preece won the race and the bonus, taking home the $100,000. It was Preece's second career Xfinity Series win.

Preece did not run any of the other Dash 4 Cash races. He returned to the No. 18 car at Daytona.

2019: JR Motorsports

For 2019, Preece joined JR Motorsports to drive their No. 8 part-time. He competed in four events, all finishing in the top ten with a highest of fourth at Pocono.

Cup Series

2015: Premium Motorsports
Preece drove the No. 98 Chevy out of the TBR shop in partnership with Premium Motorsports. After starting 37th, he finished 32nd in the Sylvania 300. Preece returned to the Cup Series for the final four races of the season with Premium. TBR did not assist his races at Martinsville, Texas, and Phoenix, though they returned to help field the No. 98 at Homestead out of their shop.

2019–2021: JTG Daugherty Racing

On September 28, 2018, Preece was announced as the new full-time driver of the No. 47 Chevrolet Camaro ZL1 for JTG Daugherty Racing in 2019, replacing A. J. Allmendinger and competing for 2019 Rookie of the Year honors. Preece also joined JR Motorsports for a part-time Xfinity Series schedule in the No. 8 Camaro.

On August 16, 2019, Preece confirmed that he would remain with the team for the 2020 season. However, he moved to JTG's No. 37 car as new teammate Ricky Stenhouse Jr. took over the No. 47. For the Toyota 500 at Darlington Raceway, Preece started on the pole via field inversion, unofficially marking his first career pole at the Cup level; he had finished 20th in the previous race, and a field inversion placed him in first. Despite running with the leaders for much of the Toyota 500's early stages, he finished last after his engine failed on lap 69. Preece was involved in a violent crash on a restart at Kansas Speedway in July 2020. On a restart down the backstretch, Christopher Bell came up in front of Ryan Newman sending Bell into the outside wall. Bell came back across traffic where Newman tagged Preece and Preece hit the inside wall head on and nearly sent Preece on his side. Fortunately, Preece walked out unscathed. It was Preece's fourth straight DNF, but broke a string of last-place finishes. Preece scored a total of 8 DNF's during the season, and finished out the year 29th in points.

Preece returned to the No. 37 in 2021, but the car did not have a charter that would have guaranteed it a spot in every race and only carried enough sponsorship for 24 of 36 races. The performance and funding of the team suffered. The No. 37 would be shutdown after 2021, leaving Preece without a ride.

2023: Stewart-Haas Racing
On November 16, 2022, Stewart-Haas Racing announced that Preece will replace Cole Custer in the No. 41 for the 2023 season while Custer would return to the 00 Xfinity Series entry. In December, Chad Johnston returned to SHR to replace Mike Shiplett as crew chief of the No. 41, after Shiplett moved to Richard Childress Racing.

Truck Series
Preece made his debut in the NASCAR Camping World Truck Series in 2021, driving the No. 17 for David Gilliland Racing in the races at Nashville Superspeedway and Pocono Raceway. Despite driving for a Chevrolet team in the Cup Series, Preece drove for DGR, a Ford team, in these starts. At Nashville, he passed Grant Enfinger with six laps remaining which enabled him to become the fifth driver in series history to win in his first career start.

2022: Part-time driver
On January 6, 2022, Stewart-Haas Racing hired Preece as a reserve driver, as the backup driver for all related teams and simulator driver for SHR. Preece will also race two Cup races for Rick Ware Racing at Dover and Charlotte, three Xfinity races for B. J. McLeod Motorsports at Richmond, Charlotte, and Nashville, and seven Truck races for David Gilliland Racing. Preece started 13th in the No. 15 Rick Ware Racing car for his Cup Series start in the 2022 DuraMAX Drydene 400 at Dover and finished 25th. Preece would run all three races during the Coke 600 weekend. He finished 11th in the Truck Series event after being involved in an accident with Carson Hocevar. On June 24, 2022, Preece would win his first career NASCAR Camping World Truck Series pole at Nashville Superspeedway. He would go onto lead 74 of the 150 laps, winning Stage 2 and his second career Truck Series race. He would also race in the XFINITY Series event the following day.

Personal life
Preece is a native of Berlin, Connecticut. He is the youngest of three sons. In 2009, he graduated from Xavier High School.

Preece married his longtime girlfriend, Heather DesRochers, in 2017. DesRochers is also a racing driver and was a participant in NASCAR's Drive for Diversity combine in 2009 and 2010, attempting to become one of the drivers selected to be in the D4D program, although she was not selected either year. The two met at Stafford Motor Speedway in 2009 and competed against each other at in the SK Modified Series in 2011, where Preece won the championship and DesRochers was the Rookie of the Year.

Motorsports career results

NASCAR
(key) (Bold – Pole position awarded by qualifying time. Italics – Pole position earned by points standings or practice time. * – Most laps led. ** – All laps led.)

Cup Series

Daytona 500

Xfinity Series

Camping World Truck Series

 Season still in progress 
 Ineligible for series points

K&N Pro Series East

K&N Pro Series West

Whelen Modified Tour

Whelen Southern Modified Tour

References

External links

 
 
 

Living people
1990 births
NASCAR drivers
People from Berlin, Connecticut
Racing drivers from Connecticut
Sportspeople from Connecticut
Joe Gibbs Racing drivers
JR Motorsports drivers